The 1932 French Grand Prix (official name: XVIII Grand Prix de l'Automobile Club de France) was a Grand Prix motor race held at Reims-Gueux on 3 July 1932. The race lasted for 5 hours, and was not run over a fixed distance.

Classification

Race

Starting grid positions

References

French Grand Prix
French Grand Prix
1932 in French motorsport